Alexander Mitchell Morgan (5 June 1908 – 10 March 1957) was an Australian rules footballer who played for the Hawthorn Football Club in the Victorian Football League (VFL).

Family
The son of David Morgan, and Mary Moir Morgan, née Mitchell, Alexander Mitchell Morgan was born at Castlemaine, Victoria on 5 June 1908.

He married Estell Mavis Hartshorn (1915-) at Mildura on 16 April 1935.

Football
Recruited from Yarrawonga, Morgan played in Hawthorn's Round 1 game against Collingwood. He was dropped to the Seconds and did not manage another senior game.

Military service
Morgan later served in the Australian Army during World War II.

Death
He died at the Royal Melbourne Hospital, in Parkville, Victoria, on 10 March 1957.

Notes

References
 
 World War Two Nominal Roll: Alexander Mitchell Morgan (VX16983), Department of Veterans' Affairs.
 World War Two Nominal Roll: Warrant Officer Class 1 Alexander Mitchell Morgan (VX114817), Department of Veterans' Affairs.
 B883, VX114817: World War Two Service Record: Alexander Mitchell Morgan (VX114817), National Archives of Australia.
 B884, VX16983: World War Two Service Record: Alexander Mitchell Morgan (VX16983), National Archives of Australia.

External links 

1908 births
1957 deaths
Australian rules footballers from Victoria (Australia)
Hawthorn Football Club players
Yarrawonga Football Club players